Pretty Porky & Pissed Off (PPPO) was a Canadian fat activist and performance art collective based in Toronto, Ontario from 1996-2005. They used their bodies as modes of resistance against discriminatory language, cultural, social practices, and policies. Their feminist, queer, and LGBT politics were part of the DIY ethics of punk rock and the Riot Grrrl movement, and feminist activism. PPPO was a Canadian trailblazer in the international fat liberation movement.

History
Pretty Porky and Pissed Off was founded by Mariko Tamaki, Allyson Mitchell, and Ruby Rowan in 1996, when they gathered friends and allies and staged their first performative political action on Queen Street West in the heart of Toronto's fashion district. As fat women playfully dressed in bright colours, polyester and camp, they asked passers by, “Do I look fat in these pants?” While this street performance called out a lack of desirable plus-sized fashion available to fat people it was furthermore the humble beginnings of what was to become a long-term, collaborative, grassroots art activism project in the fat liberation movement that engaged radical ideas about the body at various  intersections (including dimensions of the personal, political, physical, spiritual, emotional, as well as class, race, gender, sexuality, ability, health and size).

Pretty Porky and Pissed Off's membership grew to include Lisa Ayuso, Gillian Bell, Joanne Huffa, Abi Slone, Tracy Tidgwell and Zoe Whittall. Together they collaborated on political and creative projects using performance, writing, and visual art. Known for both their satirical and sincere works as well as for their use of queer spectacle, they employed dance, skits, writing, spoken word, collage, crafting, zine-making and self-publishing, community organizing, photography, film and video in their works.

Fat politics and influences 

Pretty Porky and Pissed Off took up feminist fat politics to challenge mainstream ideas about fatness and health, fatness and beauty, fatness and social worth to affirm that the fat body, and in fact every body, is desirable. "Every body is a good body," was a PPPO catchphrase. PPPO celebrated the fat body with pride and politicized it too by refusing diets and denial.
PPPO's radical approach to understanding the body was groundbreaking in Canada however they were inspired by many international fat activist including the Fat Underground, Judy Freespirit, Mama Cass, Elana Dykewomon, the FatGiRL Magazine collective, Max Airborne, Sondra Solovay, Charlotte Cooper, Kay Hyatt, Beth Ditto, Nomy Lamm, and Stacy Bias.

Art and culture 

PPPO was dedicated to political aesthetics through art, craft and performance. They were also dedicated community builders who regularly organized clothing swaps, parties and gatherings in Toronto and beyond.

PPPO played to American audiences including NOLOSE  and at New York City's queer experimental film festival, MIX, but it was in Toronto's queer arts scene that they found enduring popularity. PPPO collaborated with many Toronto artists including Keith Cole, Ina unt Ina, John Caffery (of Kids on TV), Will Munro, Kaleb Robertson, R.M. Vaughan and Christina Zeidler. PPPO performed at events like Cheap Queers, Strange Sisters, Inside Out's Local Heroes Party, Lisa Merchant's March of Dames at The Second City, Nightwood Theatre's FemCab, and Toronto's infamous queer club night, Vazaleen. In 2004 PPPO staged a multimedia theatre show, Big Judy, at Buddies in Bad Times Theatre.

Zoe Whittall dedicated her edited anthology, Geeks, Misfits and Outlaws: Short Fiction, to PPPO: "For Pretty Porky & Pissed Off - the best group of outlaws a girl could ever run with".

Allyson Mitchell's film, Free! Bake! Sale! (2004) documents Pretty Porky and Pissed Off's take on International No Diet Day outside a busy cafeteria.

Allyson Mitchell's 2013 installation masterpiece, Kill Joy's Castle: A Lesbian Feminist Haunted House featured a graveyard of tombstones of feminist organizations past including one for Pretty Porky and Pissed Off marked  "Pretty Porky & Pissed Off. Look young. Stay fat."

Pretty Porky and Pissed Off was also engaged with education, giving workshops and lectures. In 2003-2004 they were artist in residence for the Mayworks in the School Program for Toronto's Mayworks Festival of Working People in the Arts,  In 2003 they gave a guest lecturer at Concordia University's series, University of the Streets Cafe: Feminist Controversies, giving a talk, "What's wrong with a little fat?").

Select bibliography 

Mitchell, Allyson. "Pissed Off." Fat: The Anthropology of an Obsession. Eds. Don Kulick and Anne Meneley. New York: Penguin, 2005. 211-226. 
Oona Padgham. "Pretty Porky and Pissed Off and the Turtle Gals too." http://rabble.ca/news/pretty-porky-pissed-and-turtle-gals-too
Pretty Porky and Pissed Off. Double Double. 
Pretty Porky and Pissed Off. Double Double II. 
Rundle, Lisa. "Now the feminists will play with your mind." The State of the Arts: Living With Culture in Toronto. Eds. Alana Wilcox, Christina Pallasio, Jonny Dovercourt. Toronto: Coach House Books, 2006. 100-105. 
Slone, Abi. "Funny Girl: An Interview with Mariko Tamaki." Canadian Theatre Review, vol. 149, Winter 2012, ed. Moynan King.  Toronto: University of Toronto Press.

References

External links & references 
Allyson Mitchell's site
It Gets Fatter tumblr
Linda Bacon on the Health at Every Size Movement 
NOLOSE Conference 
NOLOSE : A response to white fat activism from People of Color in the fat justice movement 
Virgie Tovar's site

Canadian artist groups and collectives
Canadian performance artists
Fat acceptance movement
Feminism in Ontario
Performance artist collectives